The Penney Farms Formation is a geologic formation in Florida. It preserves fossils from the early Miocene.

Fossil content

Invertebrates

See also

 List of fossiliferous stratigraphic units in Florida

References

 

Geologic formations of Florida